Dactylia elegans is a species of demosponges in the family Callyspongiidae. It is found in Western Australia.

References

External links 

Fauna of Western Australia
Sponges of Australia
Callyspongiidae
Sponges described in 1888